"Land of Confusion" is a song by the English rock band Genesis from their 1986 album Invisible Touch. The music was written by the band, while the lyrics were written by guitarist Mike Rutherford. The song was the third track on the album and was the third track released as a single, reaching No. 14 in the UK in December 1986 and No. 4 in the U.S in January 1987. It also reached the top 10 in several other countries including Canada, Ireland, West Germany and the Netherlands. The song's video featured puppets from the 1980s UK sketch show Spitting Image.

Reception
Billboard said it has an "anxious beat" and a "tentatively hopeful lyric."  Cash Box called it a "biting and aggressive cut" highlighted by "a tough electronic rhythm and Phil Collins’ searching vocal."

Music video

The song is widely remembered for its music video, which had heavy airplay on MTV. The video features caricature puppets by the British television show Spitting Image. After Phil Collins saw a caricatured version of himself on the show, he commissioned the show's creators, Peter Fluck and Roger Law, to create puppets of the entire band, as well as all the characters in the video. 

The video opens with a caricatured Ronald Reagan (voiced by Chris Barrie), Nancy Reagan, and a monkey (a reference to the 1951 movie Bedtime for Bonzo which starred Reagan), going to bed at 4:30 PM. Nancy is absorbed in reading His Way, Kitty Kelley's unauthorised biography of Frank Sinatra. Reagan, holding a teddy bear, kisses the monkey goodnight, falls asleep and begins to have a nightmare, which sets the premise for the entire video. The video intermittently features a line of feet in combat boots marching through a swamp past the heads of Cold War-era political figures including Jimmy Carter, Margaret Thatcher, Leonid Brezhnev, and Henry Kissinger.

Caricatured versions of the band members are shown playing instruments on stage during a concert: Tony Banks on an array of synthesizers (as well as a cash register full of cookies), Mike Rutherford on a four-necked guitar, and two Phil Collins puppets: one on the drums, and one singing.

During the second verse, the video shows, in order: Benito Mussolini, Ayatollah Khomeini, Mikhail Gorbachev and his aides, and Muammar Gaddafi giving speeches on large video screens in front of mass crowds. Meanwhile, Reagan is shown putting on a Superman suit and running down a street while Collins sings,

Oh Superman where are you now
When everything's gone wrong somehow
The men of steel, the men of power
Are losing control by the hour.

Meanwhile, the "real world" Reagan is shown exhaling in a large pool of his own sweat (at one point, a rubber duck floats by), as Nancy and the monkey look out the window. During the bridge, the Superman-costumed Reagan and a triceratops (with punk jewellery) watch a television showing various clips of West German Chancellor Helmut Kohl and East German leader Erich Honecker (as Ed McMahon and Johnny Carson), Walter Cronkite, Richard Nixon, Mr. Spock (with a Rubik's Cube), and Bob Hope.

This segues into a sequence set in prehistoric times, where two dinosaurs (one wearing a bow-tie) meet with Ronald and Nancy Reagan, as a mammal eats an egg and reads a newspaper, and John Rambo hovers in the background. At the end of this part, the monkey from the prologue takes a large bone from Reagan and tosses it in the air, mimicking the first part of 2001: A Space Odyssey.

As the bone begins to fall, there is a shift to Collins catching a falling phone, into which he states: he "won't be coming home tonight, my generation will put it right", while a caricature of Prince applies mustard, ketchup, and a bun to his own tongue and devours it, and a caricature of Pete Townshend is seen playing a chord on guitar and giving a thumb-up. On the other end of the phone line are Tina Turner, Madonna, and Will Smith, each looking into their hand-held mirrors. On the verse "we're not just making promises", the bone finally lands on top of David Bowie and Bob Dylan, barely missing Mick Jagger. Reagan is then shown riding the triceratops through the streets dressed as a cowboy.

As the video nears its climax, there are periodic scenes spoofing the 1985 all-star Live Aid anthem performances of "Do They Know It's Christmas?" by Band Aid, and "We are the World" by USA for Africa. The caricatured benefit recordings show a large group of spoofed celebrity puppets, including Tina Turner, Sting, Jim and Tammy Faye Bakker, Michael Jackson, Madonna, Bill Cosby, Queen Elizabeth II, Princess Diana and Hulk Hogan singing along to the chorus of the song, with Pope John Paul II playing an electric guitar.

At the end of the video, Reagan awakens and surfaces from the pool of sweat surrounding him; Nancy at this point is wearing a snorkel. After attempting to drink from a water glass (missing his mouth and even his face à la Airplane!), he fumbles for a button next to his bed. He intends to push the one labelled "Nurse", but instead presses the one titled "Nuke", setting off a nuclear explosion. Reagan then announces: "That's one heck of a nurse!" and mugs for the camera as Nancy strikes him with her snorkel.

The video, directed by John Lloyd and Jim Yukich, and produced by Jon Blair, won the short-lived Grammy Award for Best Concept Music Video during the 30th Annual Grammy Awards. The video was also nominated for an MTV Video Music Award for Video of the Year in 1987, but lost to "Sledgehammer" by Peter Gabriel (coincidentally, former lead singer of Genesis). It also made the number-one spot on The Village Voice critic Robert Christgau's top 10 music videos in his year-end "Dean's List" feature, and number three on the equivalent list in his annual survey of music critics, Pazz & Jop (again losing out to "Sledgehammer").

Singles track listings

7": Virgin / GENS 3 (UK)
"Land of Confusion" – 4:45
"Feeding the Fire" – 5:54

7": Atlantic / 7-89336 (U.S.)
"Land of Confusion" (LP Version) – 4:45
"Feeding the Fire" – 5:54

12": Virgin / GENS 3–12 (UK)
"Land of Confusion" (Extended Remix) – 6:55
"Land of Confusion" – 4:45
"Feeding the Fire" – 5:54

12": Virgin / 608 632-213 (Germany)
"Land of Confusion" (Extended Remix) – 6:55
"Land of Confusion" – 4:45
"Feeding the Fire" – 5:54

CD: Virgin / SNEG 3–12 (UK)
"Land of Confusion" – 4:45
"Land of Confusion" (Extended Remix) – 6:55
"Feeding the Fire" – 5:54
"Do the Neurotic" – 7:08

12": Atlantic / PR 968 (U.S.)
"Land of Confusion" (Extended Remix) – 6:55
"Land of Confusion" – 4:45

7": Atlantic / 7-89336 promo (U.S.)
"Land of Confusion" (Special Edited Remix) – 3:53
"Land of Confusion" (Album Version) – 4:45

Remixes by John Potoker

UK enhanced version
"Land of Confusion"
"Sickened"
"Land of Confusion" (video)

UK, European and US vinyl 12" limited edition picture disc
"Land of Confusion"
"Sickened"

European version
"Land of Confusion" (version 1)
"Land of Confusion" (version 2)

Charts

Weekly charts

Year-end charts

Live performances
The song was played on their Invisible Touch, The Way We Walk, Calling All Stations (with Ray Wilson on vocals), Turn It On Again and The Last Domino? tours.

Disturbed version 

The American heavy metal band Disturbed released a cover of the song on their third studio album, Ten Thousand Fists. The song became the fourth single from that album. Vocalist David Draiman commented that the aim of covering the song was "taking a song that's absolutely nothing like us and making it our own." The line "And the sound of your laughter" in the original's bridge was replaced by "In the wake of this madness," while the bridge of the song was replaced with a short solo by guitarist Dan Donegan.

It was accompanied by a music video animated by Todd McFarlane, known as the creator of the comics series Spawn. McFarlane had previously animated the music videos for the songs "Freak on a Leash" by Korn and "Do the Evolution" by Pearl Jam. According to McFarlane, the music video is "a big view of the corporate world and how it all ties into just one big beast for me... The world is run by one giant thing, which is driven by greed and lust." "Land of Confusion" reached No. 1 in the Hot Mainstream Rock Tracks; making it Disturbed's first No. 1 single on that chart.

The video starts out with The Guy, Disturbed's mascot, falling to earth. It then shows military forces bearing the symbol of a dollar sign within a circle of white within a field of red, followed by legions of black-clad soldiers reminiscent of Adolf Hitler's Schutzstaffel. The video then shows the Guy, escaping bondage from chains, as the military forces continue to assault cities and civilians. Later on, leaders of various nations of the world (bearing close physical resemblance to George W. Bush, Vladimir Putin, Jacques Chirac, Junichirō Koizumi and Tony Blair) are shown sitting at a table with the same dollar sign on it. Eventually, the Guy confronts the soldiers, and leads the people in rebellion. Flags of several powerful nations are then shown, with the final flag sporting the dollar sign. The Guy leads the rebels to the headquarters of the United Nations where they disrupt a meeting of the U.N. representatives. The Guy then leads the angry mob into a back room where they confront the real power behind the throne, a gigantic, bloated Fat Cat. The mob then drags him to the ground and once immobilized, the Guy destroys the Fat Cat, who explodes into a shower of dollar bills.

Charts

See also
List of Billboard Mainstream Rock number-one songs of the 2000s

References

External links

1986 songs
1986 singles
2006 singles
Caricature
Disturbed (band) songs
Genesis (band) songs
Grammy Award for Best Concept Music Video
Music videos featuring puppetry
Animated music videos
Protest songs
Song recordings produced by Hugh Padgham
Songs about nuclear war and weapons
Songs written by Mike Rutherford
Songs written by Phil Collins
Songs written by Tony Banks (musician)
Spitting Image
Atlantic Records singles
Virgin Records singles
Reprise Records singles